Village of the Branch Historic District is a national historic district located at Village of the Branch in Suffolk County, New York.  The district has 22 contributing buildings, one contributing structure, and four contributing objects.  It consists of 15 houses, a church, and a library built between about 1700 and 1965.  Located within the district and listed separately on the register are the Halliock Inn and First Presbyterian Church.

It was added to the National Register of Historic Places in 1986.

References

Historic districts on the National Register of Historic Places in New York (state)
Federal architecture in New York (state)
Historic districts in Suffolk County, New York
National Register of Historic Places in Suffolk County, New York